Harry Stoke is a village in the parish of Stoke Gifford, South Gloucestershire, England.

History
There were three manors in the parish of Stoke Gifford. The Giffards and Berkeleys held Stoke and Walls. Harry Stoke was a separate manor held by Aldred in Saxon times, Theobald in Norman times and the Blount and De Filton families in medieval times. The Berkeleys bought it in the 16th century.

One of the last coal mines in the Bristol Coalfield was at Harry Stoke. The mine was a drift mine, begun in 1952. Bad roof conditions made the mine uneconomical, and it closed in 1963.

Future development
In 2017, around 2,700 homes were planned to be built in Harry Stoke, along with a primary school, local centre, community facilities and landscape areas. Construction started in 2020 and 2021, building from the new bypass road as its centre.

References

External links 

Stoke Gifford parish website
Southern Brooks Archaeology
Adrian Kerton's History pages

Villages in South Gloucestershire District
Bristol Coalfield